Darreh Shur or Darrehshur or Darreh-ye Shur or Darrah Shur or Dareh Shoor may refer to:
 Darreh Shur, Ardal, Chaharmahal and Bakhtiari Province
 Darreh Shur, Miankuh, Ardal County, Chaharmahal and Bakhtiari Province
 Darreh Shur, Lordegan, Chaharmahal and Bakhtiari Province
 Darreh Shur-e Khong, Chaharmahal and Bakhtiari Province
 Darreh Shur-e Mehdi, Chaharmahal and Bakhtiari Province
 Darreh Shur, Fars
 Darreh Shur, Mamasani, Fars Province
 Darreh Shur, Kerman
 Darreh Shur, Khuzestan
 Darreh Shur, Kohgiluyeh and Boyer-Ahmad
 Darreh Shur, Lorestan
 Darreh Shur, Markazi